The giant danio (Devario aequipinnatus) is a tropical fish belonging to the minnow family Cyprinidae.  Originating in Sri Lanka, Nepal, and the west coast of India, this species grows to a maximum length of 4-6 inches (10-15 cm), making it one of the largest of the danionins.  It is characterized by a blue and yellow, torpedo-shaped body with gray and clear fins.

In the wild, giant danios live in clear streams and rivers among hills at elevations up to 1000 ft (300 m) above sea level.  Their native substrate is small gravel.  They are native to a tropical climate and prefer water with a 6-8 pH, a water hardness of 5.0-19.0 dGH, and a temperature range of 72-81 °F (22-27 °C).  As surface dwellers, their diets consist predominantly of exogenous insects, but is also supplemented by worms and crustaceans.

In captivity, giant danios will usually accept most foods.  They are a somewhat aggressive fish, and may bully other fish in community tanks.  Giant danios appreciate water movement to simulate the motion of the rivers and fast-moving streams of their origins, and prefer to school.

Giant danios are also used as dither fish in South and Central American cichlid aquariums. The larger cichlids chase and defend their territories against the giant danios, which allows the cichlids to exhibit more natural behavior.

As egg-scatterers, danios produce around 300 eggs in a single spawning.  They spawn in clumps of plants.

A so-called "golden giant danio", sometimes seen, is in reality a partial albino fish. Devario affinis, Devario browni, Devario malabaricus, and Devario strigillifer were originally deemed synonyms, but are now valid species.

Diet 
The main component of giant danios' diet in the wild are flying insects. This diet is supplemented with aquatic invertebrates such as worms and crustaceans. In captivity giant danios feed on mosquito larvae, chironomous larvae, white worms, chopped earth worms, or commercially available pet food.

Habitat 
Giant danios are found in fast-flowing streams, usually in hilly areas. Giant danios prefer shaded and clear water. They also prefer gravel or sand sediment. Giant danios are shoaling fish, meaning they are found in social groups.

Reproduction and lifecycle 
Giant danio breeding can be induced in captivity. In captivity, breeding is induced by increasing water temperature and creating artificial rain. Juveniles begin to resemble their adult form after 65 days of development. Females are larger than males and also possess a more rounded abdomen. Males interested in spawning chase females and ram into their abdomens with their heads.

Distribution 
Giant danios are native to the Indian subcontinent and most of Indochina. Their range runs from Pakistan to Cambodia.

Importance to humans 
Giant danios are important in the aquarium trade. About 85% of Indian exports of giant danios are wild caught.

References

Further reading
 Dey S., Ramanujam S.N., Mahapatra B.K., 2014. Breeding and development of ornamental hill stream fish Devario aequipinnatus (McClelland) in captivity. International Journal of Fisheries and Aquatic Studies 1(4):01-07.
 Gilpin D., Consultant: Schmid-Araya J.,2012. The Illustrated World Encyclopedia of Freshwater Fish and River Creatures. Anness Publishing.

External links
 Devario aequipinnatus
 Devario aequipinnatus on Fish Mapper

Freshwater fish of Sri Lanka
Devario
Fish described in 1839
Taxa named by John McClelland (doctor)